Chris Wells (born November 12, 1975) is a Canadian retired professional hockey player who played in the NHL with the Pittsburgh Penguins and Florida Panthers.

Playing career
Wells was playing with the Seattle Thunderbirds in the WHL when he was drafted in the 1st round, 24th overall by the Pittsburgh Penguins in the 1994 NHL Entry Draft. His large size (6'6" 223 lbs) along with a strong physical presence and scoring touch contributed to his high draft choice. For the 1994–1995 season Wells returned to the Thunderbirds and scored 108 points in 68 games while contributing 148 PIMs as well. The following year Wells made his debut in the NHL, appearing in 54 games with the Penguins. Wells began the 1996–97 year with the Cleveland Lumberjacks of the IHL when he was traded by the Penguins to the Florida Panthers for Stu Barnes and Jason Woolley. He played 4 years with the Panthers, having his best year during the 1997–98 campaign in which he scored 15 points and appeared in 61 games.

Wells also skated for the New York Rangers and was signed by the Dallas Stars in 2000 . Instead he was sent to the Utah Grizzlies. On November 20, 2002, Wells debuted in the Russian Superleague with the Khabarovsk Amur Tigers and played on a line with former NHL all-star Sergei Krivokrasov. Wells would go on to play parts of three seasons in  Italy, Russia and Denmark.

Wells retired from hockey in 2005.

Career statistics

Awards
1995: WHL West First All-Star Team
2000: Calder Cup winner AHL
2004: European championship Italy

References

External links

1975 births
Living people
Amur Khabarovsk players
Cleveland Lumberjacks players
Canadian expatriate ice hockey players in Russia
Florida Panthers players
Hartford Wolf Pack players
Ice hockey people from Calgary
Louisville Panthers players
National Hockey League first-round draft picks
Peoria Rivermen (AHL) players
Pittsburgh Penguins draft picks
Pittsburgh Penguins players
Portland Pirates players
Rødovre Mighty Bulls players
Seattle Thunderbirds players
Utah Grizzlies (IHL) players
Canadian ice hockey centres